Isolation Point is a small volcanic peak projecting through the ice sheet covering the southeastern extremity of White Island, in the Ross Archipelago, Antarctica. It was so named because of its remote position by the New Zealand Geological Survey Antarctic Expedition, 1958–59.

References

Headlands of the Ross Dependency
White Island (Ross Archipelago)